The 2018–19 Miami RedHawks women's basketball team represents Miami University during the 2018–19 NCAA Division I women's basketball season. The RedHawks, led by second year head coach Megan Duffy, play their home games at Millett Hall, as members of the East Division of the Mid-American Conference. They finished the season 23–9, 13–5 in MAC play to finish in second place in the East Division. They advanced to the semifinals of the MAC women's tournament where they lost to Ohio. They received an at-large bid to the Women's National Invitation Tournament where they lost to Western Kentucky in the first round.

Roster

Schedule

|-
!colspan=9 style=| Exhibition

|-
!colspan=9 style=| Non-conference regular season

|-
!colspan=9 style=| MAC regular season

|-
!colspan=9 style=| MAC Women's Tournament

|-
!colspan=9 style=| WNIT

Rankings
2018–19 NCAA Division I women's basketball rankings

See also
2018–19 Miami RedHawks men's basketball team

References

2018–19 Mid-American Conference women's basketball season
2017-18
2018 in sports in Ohio
2019 in sports in Ohio
Miami